The 2018 Starrcade was the 20th Starrcade professional wrestling streaming event. It was the second Starrcade promoted by WWE and was held as a live event for wrestlers from the promotion's Raw and SmackDown brand divisions. A portion of the event was taped and aired as a one-hour WWE Network special. It took place on November 24, 2018, at the U.S. Bank Arena in Cincinnati, Ohio, with the one-hour special airing on November 25. The event included a special appearance from WWE Hall of Famer Ric Flair.

Eleven matches were contested on the card, four of which were shown for the one-hour WWE Network special. In the main event of the non-televised live show, Seth Rollins defeated Dean Ambrose in a steel cage match to retain Raw's Intercontinental Championship. In the main event of the televised portion of the show, AJ Styles defeated Samoa Joe in another steel cage match.

Production

Background 
Starrcade was a live closed-circuit event that was conceived in 1983 by Dusty Rhodes. The event was originally produced under the National Wrestling Alliance (NWA) banner by NWA member Jim Crockett Promotions (JCP). The NWA and JCP regarded Starrcade as their flagship event of the year, much in the same vein that its rival, the World Wrestling Federation (WWF), would begin to regard WrestleMania two years later. In 1988, JCP was sold to Turner Broadcasting and became World Championship Wrestling (WCW), with Starrcade being held by WCW until 2000; WCW and its assets were acquired by the WWF the following year (the WWF itself was renamed to WWE in 2002).
 
After a 17-year hiatus, WWE revived Starrcade as a live event on November 25, 2017, held exclusively for wrestlers from the promotion's SmackDown brand division. On September 17, 2018, WWE revealed that a second Starrcade event, featuring both the Raw and SmackDown brands, would be held on November 24 at the U.S. Bank Arena in Cincinnati, Ohio. On November 16, it was announced that unlike the previous year, a portion of the 2018 event would be taped and air on November 25 as a one-hour WWE Network special.

Storylines 

Starrcade consisted of eleven professional wrestling matches, four of which aired on the WWE Network special, that involved various different wrestlers from pre-existing scripted feuds and storylines. Wrestlers portrayed heroes, villains, or less distinguishable characters in scripted events that built tension and culminated in a wrestling match or series of matches. Results were predetermined by WWE's writers on the Raw and SmackDown brands, while torylines were produced on WWE's weekly television shows, Monday Night Raw and SmackDown Live.

On the August 7 episode of SmackDown, The New Day's Big E and Kofi Kingston defeated The Bar (Cesaro and Sheamus) to become the number one contenders for The Bludgeon Brothers' (Harper and Rowan) SmackDown Tag Team Championship at SummerSlam, where The New Day won by disqualification, but did not win the titles. The New Day would win the championships on the following episode of SmackDown and retained them at Hell in a Cell.  On October 16 at SmackDown 1000, The Bar defeated The New Day to win the championship. A rematch was later scheduled for Starrcade.

At SummerSlam, during the WWE Championship match between AJ Styles and Samoa Joe, Joe taunted Styles by disrespecting his wife and daughter, who were in attendance. An irate Styles attacked Joe with a steel chair, resulting in Joe winning by disqualification, but Styles retaining the title. On August 24, a rematch between the two for the title was scheduled for Hell in a Cell. At the event, Styles countered Joe's "Coquina Clutch" into a pin to retain the championship, despite Styles tapping out to the "Coquina Clutch" which the referee did not see. After the match, Joe attacked Styles. An irate Joe demanded a rematch with Styles. Paige agreed and scheduled a third match between the two for the title at Super Show-Down, which Styles won. A fourth encounter between the two, this time as a steel cage match, was later scheduled for Starrcade.

At SummerSlam, Charlotte Flair defeated Becky Lynch and Carmella in a triple threat match to capture the SmackDown Women's Championship. After the match, Lynch attacked Flair, thus turning heel in the process. Throughout following weeks, the two attacked each other. At Hell in a Cell, Lynch defeated Flair to win the championship. A rematch was later scheduled for Starrcade. On November 22, Lynch was replaced in the match by Asuka after suffering a legitimate facial injury.

On October 16 at SmackDown 1000, Rey Mysterio competed in his first WWE singles match since 2014, where he defeated United States Champion Shinsuke Nakamura in a non-title WWE World Cup qualifying match. A rematch for the United States Championship was later scheduled for Starrcade.

On the October 22 episode of Raw, after Seth Rollins and Dean Ambrose captured the Raw Tag Team Championship from Dolph Ziggler and Drew McIntyre, Ambrose suddenly attacked Rollins, turning heel. Two weeks later on Raw, Ambrose proceeded to attack Rollins again, after the latter lost the titles in a handicap match against AOP (Akam and Rezar). The following week, Ambrose set his signature Shield gear ablaze, after explaining his attack on Rollins, stating that he was a "burden" to both of his former Shield teammates and they made him weak. After Rollins defeated Shinsuke Nakamura at Survivor Series, it was announced that Rollins would defend the Intercontinental Championship against Ambrose in a Street Fight at Starrcade. On November 22, it was announced that the match would now be held in a steel cage.

Results

References

External links 
 

2018 in Ohio
Events in Cincinnati
2018
Professional wrestling in Cincinnati
2018 WWE Network events
November 2018 events in the United States